Kornet-D is a Russian anti-tank guided missile system platform based on the GAZ-2975. It employs 9M133M Kornet-M missiles in both tandem-HEAT or thermobaric warhead variants.

It is capable of launching a salvo of two missiles less than a second apart, either at a single target or at two different targets simultaneously. The two-missile salvo is intended to either defeat active protection systems or to ensure a single tank's destruction in the absence of an active protection system. The Kornet-D is equipped with an automatic tracking system, which tracks and guides each missile to their assigned targets without an operator's aid. The operator may switch targets or override missile guidance during the missile's flight. However, the vehicle must track the target until the missile impacts and is not a fire and forget system.

Armament

The main and only armament on the Kornet-D are two 9M133M Kornet-EM quad-launchers. The launchers are both equipped with automatic tracking systems that guides each launcher's missile to the target. The Kornet-D carries 16 missiles total, with 8 in reserve. The missiles have a range of 8,000 meters with the standard Tandem-HEAT warhead, and 10,000 meters with the thermobaric warhead-equipped variants. The standard variant of the Kornet-EM can penetrate 1,300 mm of RHA after ERA.

The system can be controlled remotely at a distance of 50 meters.

Current operators

In game industry
MMO game Armored Warfare has Kornet as a machine of 10 tier.

References

 Kornet-EM
 Противотанковые ракетные комплексы тульского КБП

See also

 List of Russian weaponry

Weapons of Russia
Anti-tank guided missiles of Russia
Military vehicles introduced in the 2010s